Co-operative Arts & Science College, Madayi, is a Kerala government aided degree college located in Madayi, Kannur district, Kerala. It was established in the year 1980. The college is affiliated with Kannur University. This college offers different courses in arts, commerce and science.

Departments

Science
Mathematics

Arts and Commerce
Malayalam
English
History
Physical Education
Commerce
Bachelor of Business Administration- BBA
Arabic
Hindi
Economics
Sociology

Accreditation
The college is  recognized by the University Grants Commission (UGC).

References

External links
http://www.cascollege.ac.in

Universities and colleges in Kannur district
Educational institutions established in 1980
1980 establishments in Kerala
Arts and Science colleges in Kerala
Colleges affiliated to Kannur University